Muhamed Memić (born 2 September 1960) is a Bosnian former handball player who competed for Yugoslavia in the 1988 Summer Olympics.

Club career
After starting out at his hometown club Derventa, Memić spent one season with Metaloplastika, before joining Sloga Doboj. He moved abroad to Spain and signed with Xerox Arrate in 1989.

International career
At international level, Memić represented Yugoslavia at the 1986 World Championship, winning the gold medal. He was also a member of the team that won the bronze medal at the 1988 Summer Olympics.

References

External links
 Olympic record
 

1960 births
Living people
People from Derventa
Bosnia and Herzegovina male handball players
Yugoslav male handball players
Olympic handball players of Yugoslavia
Olympic bronze medalists for Yugoslavia
Handball players at the 1988 Summer Olympics
Olympic medalists in handball
Medalists at the 1988 Summer Olympics
RK Metaloplastika players
Liga ASOBAL players
Expatriate handball players
Yugoslav expatriate sportspeople in Spain